Robert Bruce Atwood (March 31, 1907 – January 10, 1997) was an American journalist who served as the long-time editor and publisher of the Anchorage Times. He was also an early advocate of Alaska statehood.

Biography
Robert Bruce Atwood, known as Bob Atwood or Robert Atwood, was born on March 31st, 1907 in Chicago, Illinois. He graduated from Clark University with a Bachelor of the Arts degree in Journalism, and in 1932, married social worker Evangeline Atwood (née Rasmuson), the older sister of Anchorage Mayor Elmer E. Rasmuson. They had two daughters, Marilyn and Elaine.

Anchorage Times and Alaska statehood 

Atwood moved to Anchorage, Alaska in 1935. With the help of his father-in-law, he purchased the struggling Anchorage Daily Times. Under his guidance, it became Alaska's largest daily newspaper.

In 1949, the Alaska Territorial Legislature formed the Alaska Statehood Committee, appointing Atwood as Chairman. His pro-statehood lobbying efforts included visits to Washington, D.C. and a steady stream of articles in his newspaper, such as a 1955 editorial where he argued that whereas commonwealth status was "wonderful" for Puerto Rico, "it wouldn't give Alaskans self-government, control of resources, tax exemptions or any of a number of benefits claimed by its supporters here."

In 1954, Atwood partnered with his brother-in-law Elmer E. Rasmuson to invest in the lease of potential oil fields on the Kenai Peninsula. The investment generated a fortune after Richfield Oil Corporation discovered oil in 1957 near the Swanson River.

On June 30, 1958, the United States Senate passed the Alaska Statehood Act, and President Eisenhower signed it on July 7th. Atwood's Anchorage Daily Times celebrated with a headline in six-inch type: “WE’RE IN.”, which became a defining finish to the fight for Alaskan statehood.

On January 3, 1959, Atwood was present (along with Senators Bob Bartlett and Ernest Gruening, Representative Ralph Julian Rivers and Territorial Governors Waino Hendrickson and Mike Stepovich) in the Cabinet Room when President Dwight D. Eisenhower signed the proclamation that made Alaska the 49th state admitted into the United States.

Philanthropy 
In 1962, Atwood endowed the Atwood Foundation to promote education and the arts. In 1979, he established the Atwood Chair of Journalism at the University of Alaska Anchorage.

The Alaska Center for the Performing Arts was constructed in 1989, with the largest performance space designated as the Evangeline Atwood Concert Hall.

Later life 
Beginning in 1959 and continuing until the 1980s, Atwood unsuccessfully campaigned for the capital of Alaska to be moved from Juneau to Anchorage, due to Anchorage's growing influence as the population center of the state, with the Anchorage Metropolitan Area holding half of the state's population.

In 1990, Robert Atwood stepped down as editor and sold the Anchorage Times to oil tycoon Bill Allen.

Death 
Atwood died in Anchorage, Alaska on January 10, 1997, ten years after the death of his wife.

Legacy
At the time of his death, Robert Atwood was collaborating with journalist John Strohmeyer on a biography. After Atwood's death, Strohmeyer completed the work under the title Alaska Titan. But before it could be published, Atwood's daughter, Elaine, sued to prevent it from being distributed. In 1999, Strohmeyer and Elaine Atwood entered into an agreement giving Elaine Atwood two years to produce her own biography, to be entitled Bob Atwood's Alaska. Bob Atwood's Alaska did not appear until after Elaine Atwood's death in 2003.

In 1998, the Robert B. Atwood Building at 550 W. Seventh Avenue in Anchorage was named by the Alaska State Legislature. The Atwood name also appears in the Atwood Center at Alaska Pacific University.

References

 "Atwood family papers, Archives and Special Collections, Consortium Library, University of Alaska Anchorage."
 Profile from the Anchorage Daily News' "Alaska Scrapbook"
 Profile at "Alaskans for Statehood"
 "Commonwealth Not For Alaska"

Bibliography
 Atwood, Robert B. Bob Atwood's Alaska: The Memoirs of a Legendary Newspaper Man 2003

External links
 Atwood Foundation

1907 births
1997 deaths
Alaska Republicans
American newspaper publishers (people)
American Presbyterians
Businesspeople from Alaska
Businesspeople from Chicago
Clark University alumni
Editors of Alaska newspapers
People from Worcester, Massachusetts
University of Alaska Anchorage people
20th-century American businesspeople